Sacred Heart Higher Secondary School Thiruvambady (SHHSS) is located in Thiruvambady, India, 35 km from Kozhikode city.  It is managed by the Sacred Heart Forane Church Thiruvambady under the Diocese of Thamarassery. It is a Christian minority institution using the Kerala state syllabus.

It is located in the heart of Thiruvampady town. It teaches grades 1st to 10th in the Malayalam language. In higher secondary school Science, Humanities, Commerce and Economics courses are available.

The Sacred Heart UP School was established in 1947 and high school was established in 1955. In 2000 a higher secondary batch was established. 1500 students study in the school.

See also
 Thiruvambady
 Sacred Heart Forane Church Thiruvambady
 Infant Jesus School, Thiruvambady

References

Catholic secondary schools in India
Christian schools in Kerala
High schools and secondary schools in Kerala
Schools in Kozhikode district
1955 establishments in India